Schrenkia is a genus of flowering plants belonging to the family Apiaceae.

Its native range is Central Asia (within Kazakhstan, Kyrgyzstan, Tajikistan and Uzbekistan) to Xinjiang.

The genus name of Schrenkia is in honour of Alexander von Schrenk (1816–1876), a Russian naturalist born near Tula in what was then the Russian Empire. He was a brother to zoologist Leopold von Schrenck (1826–1894). 
It was first described and published in Enum. Pl. Nov. Vol.1 on page 63 in 1841.

Known species
According to Kew:
Schrenkia alaica 
Schrenkia congesta 
Schrenkia golickeana 
Schrenkia hebecarpa 
Schrenkia involucrata 
Schrenkia kultiassovii 
Schrenkia papillaris 
Schrenkia pulverulenta 
Schrenkia pungens 
Schrenkia turkestanica 
Schrenkia ugamica 
Schrenkia vaginata

References

Apiaceae
Apiaceae genera
Plants described in 1841
Flora of Central Asia
Flora of Xinjiang